Gwyn Thomas Manning (19 August 1915 – 15 February 2003) was a Welsh amateur footballer who captained Great Britain at the 1948 Summer Olympics.

Career
Manning played club football with Troedyrhiw, Treharris and Merthyr Tydfil. He combined his playing career with a job as a painter and decorator. He also played for the Wales amateur national team.

He represented Great Britain at the 1948 Summer Olympics, and was the team's captain at the tournament.

References

1915 births
2003 deaths
Welsh footballers
Troedyrhiw F.C. players
Treharris Athletic Western F.C. players
Merthyr Tydfil F.C. players
Association football fullbacks
Wales amateur international footballers
Footballers at the 1948 Summer Olympics
Olympic footballers of Great Britain